Colonel  John Macleod of Colbecks (1761–1822) was a British soldier, during the Napoleonic Wars. He was a son of Donald Macleod tacksman of Balallan in the Isle of Lewis and Jane, daughter of Malcolm Macleod 10th of Raasay.

Biography
The Princess Charlotte of Wales or MacLeod Loyal Fencible Highlanders, as they were called, were raised by MacLeod, who was appointed Colonel, in 1799. This was the last fencible regiment raised in the Highlands. It was inspected and embodied at Elgin, by Major-General Leith Hay, in June 1799, and was sent at once to Ireland for active service there. After three years in that country the regiment embarked for England and was reduced at Tynemouth Barracks in June 1802.This does not mean that the regiment was disbanded; it may have existed for some years longer, in which case the final disbandment would have taken place on 7 January 1809.

During the 1810s the Macleod family lived at Charlton Kings near Cheltenham in England, and were active in the social scene in the city. The composer Charles Edward Horn (1786–1849) knew them and dedicated Daughter of Love to "Mrs Macleod [an] aunt [of] the Countess of Loundoum, [and] a very delightful musician and singer".

Macleod died in 1823, as the following notice from Blackwoodfs Magazine of that year shows: "In Bury Street, St. James’, London, Colonel John MacLeod of Colbeck. With him expired the last of a branch of an ancient and distinguished clan".

Family
In 1782 MacLeod married Jane (or Jean), daughter of John MacLeod of Raasay. They had children, one son, Barlow, and five daughters. Barlow and the four elder daughters died unmarried, the fifth, Susan, married Mr. Andrews and had two sons, Hastings (buried at Canterbury) and Greville.

Legacy
The piobaireachd (bagpipe music) Lament for MacLeod of Colbecks was probably written for Colonel John Macleod of Colbecks on his death in 1823.

In 1906 there was, in the possession of Mr. M. C. MacLeod, Edinburgh, a presentation sword, bearing the following inscription:

Notes

References
. Endnote:

Attribution

1823 deaths
British Fencibles officers
Year of birth unknown
1761 births